Uncharacterized protein C12orf60 is a protein that in humans (Homo sapiens) is encoded by the C12orf60 gene. The gene is also known as LOC144608 or MGC47869. The protein lacks transmembrane domains and helices, but it is rich in alpha-helices. It is predicted to localize in the nucleus.

The C12orf60 mature mRNA transcript is 1139 nucleotides long and encodes a protein containing 245 amino acids. The protein lacks transmembrane domains and helices, but it is rich in alpha-helices. It is predicted to localize in the nucleus, but its function is not yet well understood by the scientific community. The gene was listed as a potential biomarker for detecting the efficacy of allergen immunotherapy.

The gene is highly expressed in the testes and colon, but it is also expressed in the kidney, breast carcinomas, brain, and various endocrine glands.

Gene

Locus and size 
C12rf60 is located on Chromosome 12 beginning at 14,803,572 bp and ending at 14,823,858 bp, spanning 20,287 base pairs It is located on the forward/positive strand between the 12p12.3 and 12p13.1 cytogenic bands. Other genes that are within 100 kilobases of this gene include:
 Positive/Forward Strand
 H2A histone family member J (H2AFJ)
 Negative/Backwards Strand
 Single-pass membrane protein with coiled-coil domains 3 (SMCO3)
 WW domain binding protein 11 (WBP11)
 ADP-ribosyltransferase 4 (ART4)
 Histone cluster 4, H4 (HIST4H4)
 LOC105369669
 Matrix Gla protein (MGP)

Common aliases 
C12orf60 is also known as LOC144608 and MGC47869.

mRNA 
A total of 22 exons exist within the gene.5 From these exons, there are 13 transcript variants. 12 of these transcript variants are predicted, and only a further 7 of these are predicted to encode a protein. Furthermore, they are predicted to encode the same protein. 

The notable features of the mRNA sequence include two polyadenylation signals in the 3' untranslated region (UTR), and it is the target of several RNA-binding proteins (RBP) including RBP-MBNL1 in the 5' UTR. A single intron splice site exists in the primary transcript, as does an upstream in-frame stop codon.

Protein

Composition 
C12orf60 has a predicted isoelectric point of 8.19 and a molecular weight of 27.6 kiloDaltons. Glycine and tyrosine residues are relatively less prevalent compared to other proteins in the human proteome, while methionine is more prevalent.

Topology 
The protein product is predicted to have multiple α-helices, coiled coil, and one β-sheet. It is suggested that the protein does not contain transmembrane regions or helices, meaning that the protein is not anchored to the cell membrane nor an intracellular membrane like the Golgi apparatus.

Conserved domains 
In the predicted protein product, C12orf60 contains a conserved protein domain of 225 amino acids. This domain (DUF4533) is within in the pfam15047 family of proteins. Only one other gene is listed within this family: C12orf69, which is also known as SMOC3 (single-pass membrane protein with coiled-coil domains 3).

Analysis of human C12orf60 and 9 of its orthologs reveals a highly conserved ERL motif starting at the 10th residue of the human protein sequence. It is not known whether this motif occurs in other proteins.

Other conserved residues are Asp25, Ser28, Phe37, Met41, Glu69, Leu85, Lys88, Leu143, Pro147, Ile148, Leu151, Gln164, Lys189, Leu191, Ala207, and Glu212, Leu225, and Lys227. Furthermore, these residues lie within DUF4533, suggesting that these conserved amino acids are important for the function of the domain. Also, the region between the 100 and 150 residues are not conserved. Thus, this region is not likely vital to the protein's function.

Post-translational modification 
Since it is predicted that the protein product is intracellular, extracellular modifications are not predicted to occur on C12orf60. Other modifications such as acetylation, phosphorylation, picornaviral protease cleavage, sumoylation, and O-beta-GlcNAcylation are predicted to occur on C12orf60 as well as several of its orthologous proteins. There are two amino acids that serve as sites of both phosphorylation and O-beta-GlcNAcylation, which may indicate a site of protein activation or inactivation.

Subcellular localization 
C12orf60 is predicted to be localized in the nucleus, cytoplasm, or outside the cell. However, current literature supports its localization in the nucleus.

Expression

Tissue expression 

Expression of C12orf60 is regulated. The gene is highly expressed in the testes and colon, but it is also expressed in the kidney, breast carcinomas, various endocrine glands, and some regions of the brain. It is also expressed in the embryo body and fetus during development.

Transcriptional regulation 
The promoter GXP_71811 regulates the expression of C12orf60. The promoter is 1373 base pairs long and is also located on the positive strand. There are over 400 transcription factors that are possible matches for binding to this promoter, including those of the SOX/SRY-sex/testis determining, human and murine ETS, and homeodomain transcription factors.

Protein interactions 

Rolland et al. found that C12orf60 interacts with BMP4 (bone morphogenetic protein 4). BMP4 induces bone and cartilage formation. It also acts in mesoderm induction and fracture repair.

Several other proteins might also interact with C12orf60, and some are predicted to be co-expressed with the protein. Possible protein interactions include L3MBTL4, C3orf67, FAM78A, and PXDC1. Rats that overexpressed L3MBTL4 had higher blood pressure and heart rate.

Proteins that are thought to be co-expressed alongside C12orf60 include ELMOD2, TTC30B, and BCDIN3D. ELMOD2 is thought to be involved in antiviral responses and causing familial idiopathic pulmonary fibrosis. TTC30B is involved in the organelle biogenesis and maintenance pathway as well as intraflagellar transport. BCDIN3D is a methyltransferase and serves as a negative regulator of miRNA processing. As there is no agreement from various sources on any protein-protein interaction, it is difficult to determine if any of these interactions actually occur.

Homology

Paralogs 
There are no known paralogs to this gene within the human genome, and no paralogs of C12orf60 were found within the selected species that have a C12orf60 protein ortholog.

Orthologs 
Many orthologs are found in mammals and a couple of bird species.

Clinical significance

References in literature 
The gene is within 1 Mb of SNPs that were associated with obesity, height, and weight.

The gene was listed along with two other genes in a patent as a potential biomarker for detecting the efficacy of allergen immunotherapy. Specifically, detection of 3 copies of C12orf60 meant that immunotherapy was ineffective.

In one study, the gene was among several identified genes that were translocated in a single patient with recurrent acute lymphoblastic leukemia. This translocation was associated with apoptosis and tumorigenesis.

Another study found that the gene is upregulated by at least 1.5 fold in cells that expressed Constitutive Myocyte Enhancer Factor 2 (MEF2CA). MEF2CA is expressed naturally in the brain.

One study stated the gene contains a “perfect potential antioxidant protein 1 (ATOX1) DNA interaction site in the promoter region.”

References 

Genes on human chromosome 12